/  ( or ) is an East Asian surname. pinyin:  in Mandarin Chinese,  in Cantonese. It is the family name of the Han dynasty emperors. The character  originally meant 'kill', but is now used only as a surname. It is listed 252nd in the classic text Hundred Family Surnames. Today, it is the 4th most common surname in Mainland China as well as one of the most common surnames in the world.

Distribution
In 2019 劉 was the fourth most common surname in Mainland China. Additionally, it was the most common surname in Jiangxi province. In 2013 it was found to be the 5th most common surname, shared by 67,700,000 people or 5.1% of the population, with the province with the most people being Shandong.

Origin
One source is that they descend from the Qí (祁) clan of Emperor Yao. For example the founding emperor of the Han dynasty (one of China's golden ages), Liu Bang (Emperor Gaozu of Han) was a descendant of Emperor Yao.

Another origin is from the Jī (姬) clan of King Qing of Zhou.

History 
Liu was a place name in ancient China (located in present-day Henan). The Liu family name has two main origins from this place name.

Kongjia, the fourteenth king of the Xia dynasty, was given a male and a female dragon as a reward for his obedience to the god of heaven, but could not train them, so he hired a dragon-trainer named Liu Lei (劉累), who had learned how to train dragons from Huanlong. Liu Lei was a descendant of Emperor Yao, won the admiration of King KongJia for his skill in raising dragons. In order to reward Liu Lei, King KongJia granted him Liu (place) as his fief. Liu Lei took the name of his fief as his family name. One day, the female dragon died unexpectedly, so Liu Lei secretly chopped her up, cooked her meat, and served it to the king, who loved it so much that he demanded Liu Lei to serve him the same meal again. Since Liu Lei had no means of procuring more dragon meat, he fled the palace. Liu Lei was the first person surnamed Liu in Chinese history, and his descendant Liu Bang founded the Han dynasty.

During the Zhou dynasty, King Ding of Zhou granted Liu (place) to his younger brother Ji Jizi (姬季子) as a fief. Ji Jizi also took his fief name as his family name. Liu became a State and Ji Jizi ruled the State of Liu as Duke Kang of Liu. After more than a hundred years under the rule of the Liu family, the State of Liu was destroyed by the central government of the Zhou dynasty.

Liu was the ruling family of the Han dynasty, one of the most prosperous and influential empires in Chinese history. After the Chen Sheng Wu Guang uprising overthrew the Qin, the Han dynasty was founded by Emperor Liu Bang. Later, Emperor Liu Che helped expand the Han dynasty even further, ushering in a golden age for China.

The Han dynasty had 30 emperors were surnamed Liu, making it among the Chinese dynasties that had the most emperors. The Han dynasty lasted 400 years, making it one of the longest lasting Chinese empires in history. The Han is what gives its name to the Han people as well as Han characters / Hanzi / Chinese characters.

Even after the Han dynasty, several Liu continued to hold power within China including Liu Bei (written about in Records of the Three Kingdoms) and Liu Yuan (Han Zhao). 

Over history, several non-Han Chinese people have converted to the Liu surname, including Xiongnu and Turks.

Historical figures
 , son of King Qing of Zhou and founder of the 
 Liu Bang, Founder of the Han dynasty as Emperor Gaozu of Han
 Liu Jiao (King of Chu), the younger brother of Liu Bang and famous scholar
 Liu Ying, Second Emperor of the Han dynasty
 Liu Heng, Fifth Emperor of the Han dynasty
 Liu Qi, Sixth Emperor of the Han dynasty
 Liu Che, Seventh Emperor of the Han dynasty known for expanding the Han dynasty to its fullest extent and for a long reign of 54 years
 Liu An (King of Huainan), advisor to his nephew, Emperor Wu of Han. Best known for editing the (139 BCE) Huainanzi compendium of Daoist, Confucianist, and Legalist teachings
 Liu Sheng (King of Zhongshan), the direct ancestor of the Shu Han emperors, had more than 120 sons
 Liu Xiang, government official, scholar, and author of who lived during the Han dynasty
 Liu Fuling, Emperor of the Han dynasty
 Liu He, Emperor of the Han dynasty
 Liu Xun, Emperor of the Han dynasty
 Liu Shi, Emperor of the Han dynasty
 Liu Ao, Emperor of the Han dynasty
 Liu Xin, Emperor of the Han dynasty
 Liu Kan, Emperor of the Han dynasty
 Liu Xin, astronomer, historian, and editor during the Han dynasty
 Liu Xuan, Emperor Gengshi of the Han dynasty
 Liu Yan (Xin dynasty), general and older brother of Liu Xiu
 Liu Xiu, The restorer of the Han dynasty and the founding emperor of the Eastern Han dynasty
 Liu Dai, politician during the Eastern Han dynasty
 Liu Du (warlord), warlord and politician during the Eastern Han dynasty
 Liu Yan (Han dynasty warlord), politician and warlord during the Eastern Han dynasty
 Liu Biao, warlord during the late Eastern Han dynasty
 Liu Zhuang, Emperor of the Han dynasty
 Liu Da, Emperor of the Han dynasty
 Liu Zhao, Emperor of the Han dynasty
 Liu Hu, Emperor of the Han dynasty
 Liu Bao, Emperor of the Han dynasty
 Liu Zhi, Emperor of the Han dynasty
 Liu Hong, Emperor of the Han dynasty
 Liu Xie, Last emperor of the Han dynasty
 Liu Bei (161–223), Founding emperor of Shu Han
 Liu Shan (207–271), Second emperor of Shu Han
 Liu Hong, astronomer and mathematician of the Han dynasty
 Liu Hui, mathematician during The Three Kingdoms period
 Liu Yan (Shu Han), general during the Three Kingdoms Period
 Liu Ji (Three Kingdoms), official of Eastern Wu
 Liu Kun, general, poet and musician of the Western Jin
 Liu Yuan, First emperor of Han Zhao
 Liu He, Second emperor of Han Zhao
 Liu Cong, Third emperor of Han Zhao
 Liu Can, Fourth emperor of Han Zhao
 Liu Yao, Fifth emperor of Han Zhao
 Empress Liu E, Empress of Han Zhao
 Liu Yu, Founder of the Liu Song as Emperor Wu of Liu Song
 Liu Yilong, Emperor Wen of Liu Song
 Empress Liu, Empress of Northern Song
 Liu Sanjie, folk music singer during the Southern Song dynasty
 Liu Zhiyuan, Founding emperor of Later Han
 Liu Chong, Founding emperor of Northern Han
 Liu Yan, Founding emperor of Southern Han
 Liu Rengui, chancellor and general of the Tang dynasty
 Liu Xiangdao, chancellor of the Tang dynasty
 Liu Ji (general), general of the Tang dynasty
 Liu Ji (Tang chancellor), chancellor of the Tang dynasty
 Liu Yan (Tang dynasty), Chinese economist and politician during the Tang dynasty
 Liu Zhan, chancellor and official of the Tang dynasty
 Liu Chongwang, chancellor of the Tang dynasty
 Liu Changqing, famous poet and politician
 Liu Yuxi, famous poet and statesman
 Liu Kezhuang, famous poet of southern song
 Liu Xu, chancellor of Later Tang and Later Jin
 Liu Bingzhong, chancellor of the Yuan dynasty
 Liu Bowen, famous poet, statesman, strategist and thinker
 Liu Tongxun, politician of the Qing dynasty
 Liu Yong, politician and calligrapher of the Qing dynasty
 Liu Mingchuan, First Governor of Taiwan
 Liu Ji (politician), (born 1887), 11th Republic-era mayor of Beijing.

Notable people

References

External links
Chinese surname history: Liu

Chinese-language surnames
Multiple Chinese surnames